BTCP is benzothiophenylcyclohexylpiperidine, a psychoactive recreational drug.

BTCP may also refer to:

 British Transport Commission Police, former name of the British Transport Police
 Bachelor of Town and County Planning, a British degree abbreviation
 Breakthrough cancer pain, see

See also
 Baku–Tbilisi–Ceyhan pipeline (BTC pipeline)